Askja is a building on the campus of the University of Iceland, and named after the volcano Askja. It houses primarily the departments of biology and geosciences.  It was designed by architect Maggi Jónsson.

The building's long glass side has influenced the look of downtown Reykjavík as it faces the city hall on the other side of Tjörnin.  It took a very long time to build due to funding problems, and has been the subject of severe criticism for what is seen as practical shortcomings and susceptibility to the Icelandic climate.

Address:
Sturlugata 7,
101 Reykjavík

Design and building 
 1994, design, by architect Maggi Jónsson, of Askja began.
 Between 1996 and 2001, the outside of Askja was finished.
 The first employees moved in Askja, November 2003.
 Early 2004, the last employees moved in, and teaching began in Askja.
 The name Askja was picked from 2534 suggestions, and the person who suggested the name was awarded 100.000 ISK.

Buildings and structures in Reykjavík
University of Iceland